The Polaroid 20×24 camera is a very large instant camera made by Polaroid, with film plates that measure a nominal , giving the camera its name, although at least one camera takes pictures that are .

Design
The Polaroid 20×24 is one of the largest format cameras currently in common use, and could be hired from Polaroid agents in various countries.

A plexiglass sheet is taped to the front of the lens, and the subject uses their reflection to help determine where they are in the frame. Because of the size of the image, acquiring an image with sufficient depth of field can be a challenge, and the lens (the camera at 20×24 Studio in New York City was fitted with a Fujinon-A 600 mm 11 lens) is often stopped down to 90. Lenses were available in a variety of focal lengths ranging from 135 mm to 1200 mm, but only the 600 mm, 800 mm, and 1200 mm lenses were designed for the 20×24 format.

The 20×24 is collapsible for storage and transport like a field camera: the bellows are compressed into the body, and the body lowers into its base.

Developing chemicals are stored in foil pods housed in the processing unit at the rear of the camera, and are applied to the exposed film via  titanium rollers. The film comes on two rolls: a  negative roll and a  positive roll. After the negative is exposed, one foil pod is ruptured by the rollers and the developing chemicals are spread between the negative and positive rolls as the film exits the bottom of the camera's rear processor; 1 minutes after exposure, the negative and positive are peeled apart, producing the finished photograph.

History
According to John Reuter, a former Polaroid employee, only six cameras were built between 1976–78; five remain in use. Tracy Storer clarified that two prototypes were built first, then using the lessons learned, five finished cameras were completed; famous artists and photographers were invited to use the cameras at the Polaroid studios on the condition that Polaroid was allowed to keep some of the resulting images. The camera was built by the company's wood and metalworking studios under the supervision of John McCann, at the request of Dr. Edwin Land, who wanted to demonstrate the quality of Polacolor II film, which the company was about to launch in 8×10 format. The first portraits were taken at the 1976 Polaroid shareholder's meeting.

The 20×24 Studio was spun off from Polaroid in 1980, with Reuter assuming technical and artistic lead duties, and the Studio's camera moved to the Museum of Fine Arts, Boston in 1982. That year, camera time was made available to students. 20×24 Studio moved to New York in 1986 to service the demand for commercial photography there, and the original space became known as 20×24 Studio Boston.

In 1997, Tracy Storer assembled the first new production 20×24 in twenty years using spare parts and a 20×24 field camera front built by Wisner Classic Manufacturing Company; Storer had been hired by Calumet Photographic to build the camera for a new large format studio in San Francisco, which was renamed The Polaroid 20×24 Studio West in 2001, and later Mammoth Camera. Storer has since built additional 20×24s on private commission and for 20×24 Holdings, one of which was shipped to Germany. Wisner also offered a processor for Polaroid film (essentially the rear section of a 20×24), allowing the use of Polaroid 20×24 film with the large Wisner field camera; at least one Wisner processor is owned by 20×24 Holdings to test film.

Production of the film for the 20×24 was discontinued in 2008, with approximately 550 boxes in stock at the time. Each case of film contained one negative roll, three positive rolls, and 39 pods, able to make up to 45 exposures with sparing use. When the photographer Elsa Dorfman retired in 2015, only half the remaining stock was left, although The Impossible Project stated they were exploring how to restart film production. 20×24 Studio, which was founded by Reuter to lease the cameras and sell the required supplies, announced they had restarted production of the chemicals in 2010. Improvements to the chemistry made using the old, stored film more viable, and 20×24 Studio later announced they would be able to continue operations through 2019.

In 2021, Ethan Moses built a new Polaroid 20x24 camera, one of the first to be built by someone other than Polaroid.

Users and portrait subjects
Photographers such as Dawoud Bey, Ellen Carey, Chuck Close, Elsa Dorfman, Timothy Greenfield-Sanders, David Levinthal, Mary Ellen Mark, Robert Rauschenberg, Joyce Tenneson, Jennifer Trausch, Andy Warhol, TJ Norris, and William Wegman have used this heavy, wheeled-chassis camera. Ansel Adams used the camera, notably to make the first official photographic Presidential portrait, of President Jimmy Carter in 1979. .

To celebrate Lady Gaga's new role as Creative Director of Polaroid, a portrait of her was shot with the 20×24 camera on June 30, 2010 at the Massachusetts Institute of Technology.

References

External links
 20×24 Studio - 20×24 Holdings LLC, managed by John Reuter.
 Mammoth Camera, aka 20×24 Studio West
 
  Wisner made a comparable 20×24 field camera using regular (non-instant) sheet film.
 
  (part 1 | part 2)

Instant cameras
Polaroid cameras